is a junction railway station in Taihaku-ku,  Sendai, Miyagi Prefecture, Japan, operated by East Japan Railway Company (JR East).

Lines
Taishidō Station is served by JR East's Jōban Line and Tōhoku Main Line. The Sendai Airport Access Line also shares the same track but passes through the station without stopping.

Station layout
The station has one elevated island platform which can serve a nine-car train on each side of the platform. The station has a Midori no Madoguchi staffed ticket office.

Platforms

History
The redevelopment of the area surrounding the station, a site of former railway yard, is being carried out by the Urban Renaissance Agency under the project name . As one of infrastructures of the new town, the new station opened on March 18, 2007.

Passenger statistics
In fiscal 2018, the station was used by an average of 3,936 passengers daily (boarding passengers only).

Surrounding area
 
Natori River

See also
 List of Railway Stations in Japan

References

External links

  

Railway stations in Sendai
Tōhoku Main Line
Jōban Line
Railway stations in Japan opened in 2007
Prince Shōtoku